The 1996 Oklahoma State Cowboys baseball team represented the Oklahoma State University–Stillwater in the 1996 NCAA Division I baseball season. The Cowboys played their home games at Allie P. Reynolds Stadium. The team was coached by Gary Ward in his 19th year at Oklahoma State.

The Cowboys won the Central II Regional to advance to the College World Series, where they were defeated by the Clemson Tigers.

Roster

Schedule

! style="" | Regular Season
|- valign="top" 

|- bgcolor="#ccffcc"
| 1 || February 9 || vs  || Brazell Field • Phoenix, Arizona || 20–10 || 1–0 || –
|- bgcolor="#ffcccc"
| 2 || February 10 || vs  || Brazell Field • Phoenix, Arizona || 6–7 || 1–1 || –
|- bgcolor="#ccffcc"
| 3 || February 11 || at  || Brazell Field • Phoenix, Arizona || 22–16 || 2–1 || –
|- bgcolor="#ccffcc"
| 4 || February 16 || vs The Citadel || Alfred A. McKethan Stadium • Gainesville, Florida || 12–4 || 3–1 || –
|- bgcolor="#ffcccc"
| 5 || February 17 || vs  || Alfred A. McKethan Stadium • Gainesville, Florida || 5–6 || 3–2 || –
|- bgcolor="#ffcccc"
| 6 || February 18 || at Florida || Alfred A. McKethan Stadium • Gainesville, Florida || 4–5 || 3–3 || –
|- bgcolor="#ccffcc"
| 7 || February 23 ||  || Allie P. Reynolds Stadium • Stillwater, Oklahoma || 15–8 || 4–3 || –
|- bgcolor="#ccffcc"
| 8 || February 24 || West Virginia || Allie P. Reynolds Stadium • Stillwater, Oklahoma || 13–2 || 5–3 || –
|- bgcolor="#ccffcc"
| 9 || February 25 || West Virginia || Allie P. Reynolds Stadium • Stillwater, Oklahoma || 16–4 || 6–3 || –
|-

|- bgcolor="#ffcccc"
| 10 || March 1 || vs  || Reckling Park • Houston, Texas || 2–3 || 6–4 || –
|- bgcolor="#ccffcc"
| 11 || March 2 || at  || Reckling Park • Houston, Texas || 7–5 || 7–4 || –
|- bgcolor="#ccffcc"
| 12 || March 3 || vs  || Reckling Park • Houston, Texas || 7–4 || 8–4 || –
|- bgcolor="#ccffcc"
| 13 || March 5 || vs  || Reckling Park • Houston, Texas || 5–3 || 9–4 || –
|- bgcolor="#ccffcc"
| 14 || March 6 || vs  || Reckling Park • Houston, Texas || 16–6 || 10–4 || –
|- bgcolor="#ccffcc"
| 15 || March 7 || vs Southwestern Louisiana || Reckling Park • Houston, Texas || 21–11 || 11–4 || –
|- bgcolor="#ccffcc"
| 16 || March 9 || at  || TCU Diamond • Fort Worth, Texas || 13–8 || 12–4 || –
|- bgcolor="#ffcccc"
| 17 || March 10 || TCU || Allie P. Reynolds Stadium • Stillwater, Oklahoma || 5–10 || 12–5 || –
|- bgcolor="#ccffcc"
| 18 || March 11 ||  || Allie P. Reynolds Stadium • Stillwater, Oklahoma || 14–9 || 13–5 || 1–0
|- bgcolor="#ccffcc"
| 19 || March 12 || Iowa State || Allie P. Reynolds Stadium • Stillwater, Oklahoma || 18–3 || 14–5 || 2–0
|- bgcolor="#ccffcc"
| 20 || March 13 || Iowa State || Allie P. Reynolds Stadium • Stillwater, Oklahoma || 14–8 || 15–5 || 3–0
|- bgcolor="#ccffcc"
| 21 || March 16 ||  || Allie P. Reynolds Stadium • Stillwater, Oklahoma || 25–16 || 16–5 || 4–0
|- bgcolor="#ccffcc"
| 22 || March 17 || Missouri || Allie P. Reynolds Stadium • Stillwater, Oklahoma || 12–10 || 17–5 || 5–0
|- bgcolor="#ffcccc"
| 23 || March 20 ||  || Allie P. Reynolds Stadium • Stillwater, Oklahoma || 0–8 || 17–6 || 5–1
|- bgcolor="#ccffcc"
| 24 || March 20 || Kansas State || Allie P. Reynolds Stadium • Stillwater, Oklahoma || 7–6 || 18–6 || 6–1
|- bgcolor="#ccffcc"
| 25 || March 22 ||  || Allie P. Reynolds Stadium • Stillwater, Oklahoma || 11–7 || 19–6 || 6–1
|- bgcolor="#ffcccc"
| 26 || March 23 || Washington || Allie P. Reynolds Stadium • Stillwater, Oklahoma || 11–15 || 19–7 || 6–1
|- bgcolor="#ccffcc"
| 27 || March 23 || Washington || Allie P. Reynolds Stadium • Stillwater, Oklahoma || 11–2 || 20–7 || 6–1
|- bgcolor="#ccffcc"
| 28 || March 29 || at  || Buck Beltzer Stadium • Lincoln, Nebraska || 18–8 || 21–7 || 7–1
|-

|- bgcolor="#ffcccc"
| 29 || April 2 || at  || Hoglund Ballpark • Lawrence, Kansas || 3–5 || 21–8 || 7–2
|- bgcolor="#ffcccc"
| 30 || April 3 || at Kansas || Hoglund Ballpark • Lawrence, Kansas || 13–19 || 21–9 || 7–3
|- bgcolor="#ccffcc"
| 31 || April 6 || Kansas || Allie P. Reynolds Stadium • Stillwater, Oklahoma || 11–9 || 22–9 || 8–3
|- bgcolor="#ccffcc"
| 32 || April 6 || Kansas || Allie P. Reynolds Stadium • Stillwater, Oklahoma || 10–9 || 23–9 || 9–3
|- bgcolor="#ccffcc"
| 33 || April 7 || Kansas || Allie P. Reynolds Stadium • Stillwater, Oklahoma || 21–1 || 24–9 || 10–3
|- bgcolor="#ffcccc"
| 34 || April 10 || at Iowa State || Cap Timm Field • Ames, Iowa || 2–6 || 24–10 || 10–4
|- bgcolor="#ffcccc"
| 35 || April 10 || at Iowa State || Cap Timm Field • Ames, Iowa || 4–8 || 24–11 || 10–5
|- bgcolor="#ffcccc"
| 36 || April 12 || vs  || Drillers Stadium • Tulsa, Oklahoma || 5–7 || 24–12 || 10–6
|- bgcolor="#ccffcc"
| 37 || April 13 || vs Oklahoma || All Sports Stadium • Oklahoma City, Oklahoma || 7–1 || 25–12 || 11–6
|- bgcolor="#ccffcc"
| 38 || April 14 || vs Oklahoma || All Sports Stadium • Oklahoma City, Oklahoma || 7–1 || 26–12 || 12–6
|- bgcolor="#ccffcc"
| 39 || April 16 || at Oklahoma || L. Dale Mitchell Baseball Park • Norman, Oklahoma || 14–4 || 27–12 || 13–6
|- bgcolor="#ccffcc"
| 40 || April 17 || Oklahoma || Allie P. Reynolds Stadium • Stillwater, Oklahoma || 12–11 || 28–12 || 14–6
|- bgcolor="#ffcccc"
| 41 || April 19 || at  || Simmons Field • Columbia, Missouri || 23–24 || 28–13 || 14–7
|- bgcolor="#ffcccc"
| 42 || April 20 || at Missouri || Allie P. Reynolds Stadium • Stillwater, Oklahoma || 9–12 || 28–14 || 14–8
|- bgcolor="#ffcccc"
| 43 || April 21 || at Missouri || Allie P. Reynolds Stadium • Stillwater, Oklahoma || 5–6 || 28–15 || 14–9
|- bgcolor="#ffcccc"
| 44 || April 23 ||  || Allie P. Reynolds Stadium • Stillwater, Oklahoma || 3–7 || 28–16 || 14–9
|- bgcolor="#ffcccc"
| 45 || April 24 || at Wichita State || Eck Stadium • Wichita, Kansas || 4–19 || 28–17 || 14–9
|- bgcolor="#ffcccc"
| 46 || April 26 || at  || J. L. Johnson Stadium • Tulsa, Oklahoma || 2–7 || 28–18 || 14–9
|- bgcolor="#ccffcc"
| 47 || April 27 || Oral Roberts || Allie P. Reynolds Stadium • Stillwater, Oklahoma || 11–4 || 29–18 || 14–9
|-

|- bgcolor="#ccffcc"
| 48 || May 5 ||  || Allie P. Reynolds Stadium • Stillwater, Oklahoma || 17–2 || 30–18 || 14–9
|- bgcolor="#ffcccc"
| 49 || May 6 || Missouri Southern || Allie P. Reynolds Stadium • Stillwater, Oklahoma || 3–4 || 30–19 || 14–9
|- bgcolor="#ccffcc"
| 50 || May 7 ||  || Allie P. Reynolds Stadium • Stillwater, Oklahoma || 21–1 || 31–19 || 14–9
|- bgcolor="#ccffcc"
| 51 || May 8 || Chicago State || Allie P. Reynolds Stadium • Stillwater, Oklahoma || 15–5 || 32–19 || 14–9
|- bgcolor="#ccffcc"
| 52 || May 9 || Chicago State || Allie P. Reynolds Stadium • Stillwater, Oklahoma || 22–19 || 33–19 || 14–9
|- bgcolor="#ccffcc"
| 53 || May 11 || Kansas State || Allie P. Reynolds Stadium • Stillwater, Oklahoma || 10–6 || 34–19 || 15–9
|- bgcolor="#ccffcc"
| 54 || May 11 || Kansas State || Allie P. Reynolds Stadium • Stillwater, Oklahoma || 15–6 || 35–19 || 16–9
|- bgcolor="#ccffcc"
| 55 || May 12 || Kansas State || Allie P. Reynolds Stadium • Stillwater, Oklahoma || 26–5 || 36–19 || 17–9
|- bgcolor="#ccffcc"
| 56 || May 13 || Rice || Allie P. Reynolds Stadium • Stillwater, Oklahoma || 6–5 || 37–19 || 17–9
|-

|-
! style="" | Postseason
|- valign="top" 

|- bgcolor="#ccffcc"
| 57 || May 16 || vs Kansas State || All Sports Stadium • Oklahoma City, Oklahoma || 10–4 || 38–19 || 17–9
|- bgcolor="#ccffcc"
| 58 || May 17 || vs Oklahoma || All Sports Stadium • Oklahoma City, Oklahoma || 16–11 || 39–19 || 17–9
|- bgcolor="#ccffcc"
| 59 || May 18 || vs Missouri || All Sports Stadium • Oklahoma City, Oklahoma || 18–12 || 40–19 || 17–9
|- bgcolor="#ccffcc"
| 60 || May 19 || vs Iowa State || All Sports Stadium • Oklahoma City, Oklahoma || 15–11 || 41–19 || 17–9
|-

|- bgcolor="#ccffcc"
| 60 || May 23 || vs  || Dan Law Field • Lubbock, Texas || 6–5 || 42–19 || 17–9
|- bgcolor="#ccffcc"
| 61 || May 24 || vs  || Dan Law Field • Lubbock, Texas || 12–5 || 43–19 || 17–9
|- bgcolor="#ccffcc"
| 62 || May 25 || vs  || Dan Law Field • Lubbock, Texas || 9–3 || 44–19 || 17–9
|- bgcolor="#ccffcc"
| 63 || May 26 || vs Southern California || Dan Law Field • Lubbock, Texas || 10–2 || 45–19 || 17–9
|-

|- bgcolor="#ffcccc"
| 64 || May 31 || vs Alabama || Johnny Rosenblatt Stadium • Omaha, Nebraska || 5–7 || 45–20 || 17–9
|- bgcolor="#ffcccc"
| 65 || June 2 || vs Clemson || Johnny Rosenblatt Stadium • Omaha, Nebraska || 5–8 || 45–21 || 17–9
|-

Awards and honors 
Brian Aylor
Big Eight Conference All-Tournament Team

Danny DiPace
Big Eight Conference All-Tournament Team

Neil Forsythe
Big Eight Conference All-Tournament Team

Ryan Graves
Big Eight Conference All-Tournament Team

Jeff Guiel
All-Big Eight Conference
First Team All-American American Baseball Coaches Association
Third Team All-American Baseball America
First Team All-American Collegiate Baseball
Second Team All-American National Collegiate Baseball Writers Association

Sean McClellan
All-Big Eight Conference

Rusty McNamara
All-Big Eight Conference
Big Eight Conference All-Tournament Team

Wyley Steelmon
All-Big Eight Conference

References

Oklahoma State Cowboys baseball seasons
Oklahoma State Cowboys baseball
College World Series seasons
Oklahoma State